Alan Dawson (1 September 1932 – 29 October 2014) was an Australian rules footballer who played for the South Melbourne Football Club in the Victorian Football League.

Notes

External links 

1932 births
2014 deaths
Australian rules footballers from Victoria (Australia)
Sydney Swans players